I'd Do Anything is an ESPN reality show hosted by George Gray. The premise of the show involved three contestants trying to win a dream sports reality for a friend. The series was broadcast Tuesdays on ESPN in 2004, then Monday nights on ESPN2.

Format
The first three events are to qualify for the final. If you win an event you qualify for the finals. If two players win events, the other player goes home. If one player wins all three qualifying events, they choose their opposition for the final. The events are sports related with a twist. Whoever wins the final gets their sports dream for their friend fulfilled.

Changes
In 2004, each person had a different sports dream. In 2005, each person had the same sports dream.

UK series
The show was loosely based on a United Kingdom series of the same title which originally aired on BBC1 and hosted by Ian Wright.

References
 I'd Do Anything tests student's limits

External links
 
 
 UK Game Shows Summary

ESPN game shows
2000s American game shows
2000s American reality television series
2002 American television series debuts
2005 American television series endings
American television series based on British television series
Television game shows with incorrect disambiguation